Mayday, entitled Air Crash Investigation in Canada (alternatively known as Air Crash Investigations on Seven Network), Australia, New Zealand, South Africa, the United Kingdom (alternatively known as Air Crash: Disaster Revealed on 5Select), India, other Asian countries, and some European countries, and Air Emergency, Air Disasters, and Mayday: Air Disaster in the United States, is a Canadian documentary television program examining air crashes, near-crashes, hijackings, bombings, and other disasters. Mayday uses re-enactments and computer-generated imagery to reconstruct the sequence of events leading up to each disaster. In addition, survivors, aviation experts, retired pilots, and crash investigators are interviewed, to explain how the emergencies came about, how they were investigated, and how they might have been prevented.

In Canada itself, the program premiered on Discovery Channel Canada on 3 September 2003. Cineflix also secured deals with France 5, Discovery Channel, Canal D, TVNZ, Seven Network, Holland Media Group, and National Geographic Channel to take Mayday in 144 countries and 26 languages. The series was received well by critics and nominated for a number of awards. In 2010, Sharon Zupancic won a Gemini Award for her work on the season-seven episode, "Lockerbie Disaster", that depicts the bombing of Pan Am Flight 103 in 1988. A University of New South Wales senior lecturer, Raymond Lewis, conducted a study on teaching strategy loosely based on the series. Lewis's results indicated using the strategy had "a positive effect on learning outcomes" for prospective pilots.

Hallmarks
The series features re-enactments, interviews, eyewitness testimony, computer-generated imagery, and in nearly all of the episodes, voice-actor readings of cockpit voice recorder (CVR) transcripts to reconstruct the sequence of events for the audience. Several passengers and crew members (whether they survived the incident or not) are picked and actors/actresses play the roles of those passengers and crew throughout the flight, usually starting from boarding of the flight. The flight routines in the air traffic control, cockpit, and cabin are recreated on screen starting from departure up to the moment of the emergency. At the moment of the emergency, external views of the aircraft from different angles are recreated to show the effect and what had happened to the aircraft. The responses and reactions of the passengers, crews, and air traffic control personnel leading up to the eventual crash or emergency landing are then recreated. Scenes in the cockpit and air traffic control centres are recreated using the transcript obtained from the CVR of the aircraft and other recordings made at the time.

Throughout the episodes, the victims (or the relatives and friends of the victims) are interviewed, adding further information about a case as it relates to them personally. In addition, aviation experts, retired pilots, and investigators are interviewed on the evidence and explain how these emergencies came about and how they could have been prevented.

Production and distribution
To keep the costs down, most of the production was kept at Cineflix's offices in Toronto, Ontario, Canada. While in production, the series was sold to France 5, Discovery Channel, and Canal D. On , Cineflix announced that it had sold the series to TVNZ, Seven Network, and Holland Media Group.

In 2011, Smithsonian Networks aired season five, renamed Air Disasters, making it the first time in the United States that Mayday had aired on a channel other than National Geographic. On 25 January 2012, Cineflix Rights announced that it would be selling seasons 8, 9, and 11 (23 episodes) to Smithsonian Networks. On 28 March 2014, Cineflix Rights announced a deal with Smithsonian Networks to air seasons three, four, and 13 (34 episodes).

In 2020, The Weather Channel in the United States began airing several episodes of the series under the title Mayday: Air Disaster.

Starting in 2021 and continuing to this day, the Wonder and On the Move YouTube channels (owned by Little Dot Studios, a subsidiary of All3Media) uploaded the first nine seasons of Mayday and the Crash of the Century special with the episodes in their full uncut versions and are available in all countries, with the exception of the United Kingdom, where they are geoblocked.

In the United States, the show's tenth and twelfth seasons are available for streaming online on free, advertiser-supported streaming services Tubi and Freevee under the title Mayday: Air Disasters, while the show's first season is also made available for streaming online on Amazon Prime Video, provided by MagellanTV, under the title MayDay: Air Disaster Investigations.

In the United Kingdom, from August 2022, 5Select began rebroadcasting Seasons 2 and 3 under the alternative name Air Crash: Disaster Revealed. These series had previously been owned by Channel 5 in the initial runs. From 7 October 2022, Sky History 2 will rebroadcast Season 1 using a slightly modified version of the name used by 5Select: Air Crash: Disaster Uncovered. In the Sky History 2 rebroadcasts, the episodes were edited to remove content in order to keep the episodes to 45 minutes in length (including advertising breaks), meaning some minor inconsequential scenes which would have no impact on the episode had been taken out. Some other notable changes occurred in the versions aired on 5Select, including:
 The opening credits sequence used the name Mayday as is used in the United States, not Air Crash Investigation as is common in Europe and the UK.
 A significant number of episodes have been edited to remove scenes deemed to be offensive or distressing, such as certain swear words, blood and gore, or anything deemed "excessively violent". In addition, episodes have also been edited to remove references to any interviews conducted with experts, relatives or survivors who have either chosen not to be included, cannot be included due to perceived association to a company they do not work for, or have passed away since airing.
 Despite not being billed as Mayday episodes, the episodes in Season 3 titled as the spin-off show Crash Scene Investigation were broadcast, but incorrectly labelled as though they were, leading to EPG issues.

Episodes

As of February 2022, a total of 230 episodes of Mayday had been aired, including five Science of Disaster specials, three Crash Scene Investigation spin-offs, which do not examine aircraft crashes, and a sub-series labelled The Accident Files that aired four seasons.

Reception
The series has been well received by critics. Franck Tabouring from DVD Verdict said, "It's a well-produced show with plenty of compelling information about tragic accidents, telling how some people survived and others didn't."

The senior lecturer at the University of New South Wales, Raymond Lewis, conducted a study on teaching strategy loosely based on the series. The study was done with prospective pilots studying the "Aircraft Systems for Aviators" undergraduate course by including "study of air accidents and incidents associated with aircraft systems." The results of the study showed "the use of air accidents and incident scenarios had a positive effect on learning outcomes."

Awards and nominations
Overall, the series has been nominated for nine awards, winning two, both for film editing.

Home media
In 2009, Entertainment One released the complete first season of the show on DVD in Region 1 in Canada.

See also

Seconds From Disaster
Seismic Seconds
Blueprint for Disaster
Black Box
Why Planes Crash
Terror in the Skies

Notes

References

External links
Cineflix: Mayday
Cineflix: Mayday – Science of Disaster (Archive)
Cineflix: Crash of the Century
Mayday on Discovery Channel Canada
Air Crash Investigation on National Geographic Channel UK
Air Crash Investigation National Geographic Channel Australia
Air Disasters on Smithsonian Channel

2000s Canadian documentary television series
2010s Canadian documentary television series
2003 Canadian television series debuts
Canadian television docudramas
Television series by Cineflix
Discovery Channel (Canada) original programming
Documentary television series about aviation
English-language television shows
National Geographic (American TV channel) original programming
Television series by Bell Media
Television shows about aviation accidents or incidents
Television series featuring reenactments